Bangalore Aquarium, also known as Government Aquarium, is the second largest aquarium in India. It is located at the entrance of Cubbon Park in Bangalore, India, and was established in 1983. It has a variety of exotic cultivable as well as ornamental fish on display. It is very near to vishweshwarayya museum. The aquarium is administered by the Karnataka State Government Department of Fisheries.

Building

Government Aquarium for public display was constructed during 1972 and was officially inaugurated on 27.08.1983. Government aquarium, Cubbon park is a ‘fresh water fish aquarium’ in an octagonal shape and is a three-storied building.  The total area of the Government aquarium is 2700 sq.m. Out of the built up area is 850 sq.m.  It is the second largest aquarium in the country. 
The ground floor comprises the office. The first floor has 14 big tanks. On the second floor, aquariums are arranged in two rows and there are a total of 62 numbers of medium to small size aquaria. It has about 40-50 varieties both indigenous and exotic species of freshwater ornamental fish.
The Government Aquarium works under the direct control of the Directorate of Fisheries and Curator is the head of the aquarium.

Working days and holidays of Aquarium 
 The Aquarium is open to public on all days except:
 Mondays and second and fourth Tuesdays. 
 All Government holidays (Also if holiday falls on a Sunday)
Note: The aquarium will be open for public viewing on 26 January, 15 August and November 1 every year. (The aquarium will be closed on the next working day)
Timings: 10:00 AM to 5:30 PM
Entry Fee
 The entry fee is Rs.10 per head. 
 If the children visit aquarium through their respective schools, then the ticket rate is at Rs.5.00 per head (Up to 10th standard).
 No charges for children below 5 years.

Species on display
Fish that can be seen at the aquarium include eels, angelfish, glowlight tetra, hockey stick tetra, red-tail shark, catla, Indian tiger barb, mahseer, freshwater prawns, blue gourami, pearl gourami, gold fish, moon tail, and more.

Governance
Bangalore Aquarium is administered by the State Government.

Gallery

See also
Aquatic Kingdom, KSR Bengaluru railway station.

References

Aquaria in India
Tourist attractions in Bangalore
1983 establishments in Karnataka
Zoos established in 1983